Lumberton is a census-designated place  in Rio Arriba County, New Mexico, United States. Its population was 73 as of the 2010 census. Lumberton had a post office until it closed on January 28, 1995. U.S. Route 64 passes through the community.

It is zoned to Dulce Independent Schools.

Demographics

References

Census-designated places in New Mexico
Census-designated places in Rio Arriba County, New Mexico